Allan Lamar Green (born September 20, 1979) is an American professional boxer. He is a former NABO super middleweight champion, and has challenged for world titles at both super middleweight and light heavyweight.

Amateur career
Green had a stellar amateur career despite not making the Olympic Games, winning the 2002 National Golden Gloves, at 178 lbs, and compiling a 55-6 record. During the 2002 Golden Gloves tournament Allan beat Mike Tyson's two decade old 8 second knockout record.  He also was five time Oklahoma state champion, and four time regional champion, before coming pro at age 23.

Amateur accomplishments 
5-time Oklahoma State Champion
National Pal Silver Medalist
4-time regional Golden Glove Championships
2002 National Golden Gloves Light Heavyweight Champion

Professional career

Early years at Light Heavyweight
Green made his professional debut on November 9, 2002, with a one-round TKO victory against Robert Dykes, in his fourth fight he outpointed Ola Afolabi.  Green's career was on the upswing, and he made his ShoBox (a notable prospect show) debut with a 7-round TKO victory against Rocky Smith. It was perhaps Green's second appearance on ShoBox that gained notoriety for his blistering eighteen second KO victory against Jaidon Codrington. Green stunned Codrington and pinned him to the ropes, then threw brutal combinations before finishing with a left hook to the chin. The punch knocked Codrington unconscious and he fell through the ropes.  The one round victory earned Green the 2005 Ring Magazine knockout of the year.

Green's first challenge was against Donnie McCrary. After knocking down McCrary early in the 3rd round, Green was knocked down for the first time in his career, but rallied back and won with a sixth-round KO. Green's next fight was against Contender member Anthony Bonsante, where Green cruised and won with a sixth-round knockout.

On October 14, 2006, Green brutally TKO'd former Olympian Jerson Ravelo on ESPN.

Middleweight
On March 3, 2007, Green moved down to 162 pounds to face middleweight contender Edison Miranda.  Miranda would win by unanimous decision in San Juan, Puerto Rico.  The bout was televised on HBO, and was noted for Green's surprisingly unspectacular performance.

Miranda dominated most of the fight and knocked Green down twice in the last round. Green mentioned afterward that moving down to middleweight was a major factor in his lack of aggression. He did, however, manage to floor Miranda in the eighth round, but failed to capitalize on the opportunity.  Green stated his intentions to remain at super middleweight after this fight.

Super Middleweight
Green returned to the ring in July 2007, disposing of Darrell Woods in one round. Days after this win Green underwent major surgery to remove 85% of his colon.  Green has stated that the illness caused him problems as early as the Miranda fight.

On October 19, 2007, at the Buffalo Run Casino in Miami, Oklahoma, Allan Green stopped Sherwin Davis in two rounds. Green, fighting for the first time since July (w ko 1 Darrell Woods), and following abdominal surgery, had Davis down twice in round one before closing the show.

Allan Green defeated Rubin Williams of Detroit on January 4, 2008.  The fight was televised on ESPN2.  Green recently was forced to turn down an HBO-televised meeting with Andre Ward, who represented the U.S. in the 2004 Olympics, capturing the gold medal in the light heavyweight division. Green wants a Ward fight and another HBO exposure, but he already had made the commitment to the Williams date.

Green was scheduled to face Antwun Echols on February 29, 2008, as part of Friday Night Fights on ESPN2.  However, Green abruptly pulled out of the fight with 24 hours notice.  No explanation  was given.  

Green fought Carl Daniels on 11/15/08 in Nashville Tennessee and won by TKO in the 7th round.

Green then fought on April 25, 2009, at Foxwoods Resort, Mashantucket, Connecticut, on the under card of the Jermain Taylor vs. Carl Froch fight. Green fought Carlos de León Jr and defeated his foe by TKO in the second round. DeLeon was knocked down four times in the second round.

Super Six
In January 2010 Jermain Taylor announced his exit from Showtime's Super Six World Boxing Classic tournament.  Green was selected as his replacement and challenged World Boxing Association super middleweight champion Andre Ward on June 19. Green lost his fight against Ward by unanimous decision.

After his fight with Ward, Green should have moved on to Stage 3 of The Super Six World Boxing Classic where he should have faced Denmark's "Viking Warrior", Mikkel Kessler for the WBC Super Middleweight Title. However, on 25 August 2010, Kessler had to resign from the tournament suffering from an eye injury.

Kessler was replaced by Glen Johnson to face Green November 6, 2010, in Las Vegas, Nevada, live on Showtime. Johnson won the fight by knockout in the eighth round, eliminating Green from the tournament.

Professional boxing record

|-
|align="center" colspan=8|33 Wins (22 knockouts), 6 Losses, 0 Draws 
|-
| align="center" style="border-style: none none solid solid; background: #e3e3e3"|Result
| align="center" style="border-style: none none solid solid; background: #e3e3e3"|Record
| align="center" style="border-style: none none solid solid; background: #e3e3e3"|Opponent
| align="center" style="border-style: none none solid solid; background: #e3e3e3"|Type
| align="center" style="border-style: none none solid solid; background: #e3e3e3"|Round
| align="center" style="border-style: none none solid solid; background: #e3e3e3"|Date
| align="center" style="border-style: none none solid solid; background: #e3e3e3"|Location
| align="center" style="border-style: none none solid solid; background: #e3e3e3"|Notes
|-align=center
|Loss
|33–6
|align=left| Ahmed Elbiali
|KO
|3 
|13/01/2019
|align=left| 
|align=left|
|-align=center
|Win
|33–5
|align=left| Edgar Perez
|UD
|6 
|18/01/2018
|align=left| 
|align=left|
|-align=center
|Loss
|32–5
|align=left| Blake Caparello
|UD
|12 
|17/10/2013
|align=left| 
|align=left|
|-align=center
|Win
|32–4
|align=left| Renan St Juste
|RTD
|7 
|03/11/2012
|align=left| 
|align=left|
|-align=center
|Loss
|31–4
|align=left| Mikkel Kessler
|KO
|4 
|19/05/2012
|align=left| 
|align=left|
|-align=center
|Win
|31–3
|align=left| Sebastien Demers
|UD
|12
|15/11/2011
|align=left| 
|align=left|
|-align=center
|Win
|30–3
|align=left| Craig Gandy
|TKO
|2 
|13/08/2011
|align=left| 
|align=left|
|-align=center
|Loss
|29–3
|align=left| Glen Johnson
|TKO
|8 
|06/11/2010
|align=left| 
|align=left|
|-align=center
|Loss
|29–2
|align=left| Andre Ward
|UD
|12
|19/06/2010
|align=left| 
|align=left|
|-align=center
|Win
|29–1
|align=left| Tarvis Simms
|UD
|10
|02/10/2009
|align=left| 
|align=left|
|-align=center
|Win
|28–1
|align=left| Carlos de León Jr.
|TKO
|2 
|25/04/2009
|align=left| 
|align=left|
|-align=center
|Win
|27–1
|align=left| Carl Daniels
|TKO
|7 
|15/11/2008
|align=left| 
|align=left|
|-align=center
|Win
|26–1
|align=left| Rubin Williams
|UD
|10
|04/01/2008
|align=left| 
|align=left|
|-align=center
|Win
|25–1
|align=left| Sherwin Davis
|KO
|2 
|19/10/2007
|align=left| 
|align=left|
|-align=center
|Win
|24–1
|align=left| Darrell Woods
|KO
|1 
|13/07/2007
|align=left| 
|align=left|
|-align=center
|Loss
|23–1
|align=left| Edison Miranda
|UD
|10
|03/03/2007
|align=left| 
|align=left|
|-align=center
|Win
|23–0
|align=left| Jerson Ravelo
|TKO
|8 
|14/10/2006
|align=left| 
|align=left|
|-align=center
|Win
|22–0
|align=left| Emmett Linton
|UD
|10
|01/09/2006
|align=left| 
|align=left|
|-align=center
|Win
|21–0
|align=left| Anthony Bonsante
|TKO
|5 
|21/07/2006
|align=left| 
|align=left|
|-align=center
|Win
|20–0
|align=left| Donny McCrary
|TKO
|6 
|26/04/2006
|align=left| 
|align=left|
|-align=center
|Win
|19–0
|align=left| Mike Jackson
|TKO
|1 
|27/01/2006
|align=left| 
|align=left|
|-align=center
|Win
|18–0
|align=left| Jaidon Codrington
|KO
|1 
|04/11/2005
|align=left| 
|align=left|
|-align=center
|Win
|17–0
|align=left| Ted Muller
|UD
|10
|26/08/2005
|align=left| 
|align=left|
|-align=center
|Win
|16–0
|align=left| Rocky Smith
|TD
|7 
|20/05/2005
|align=left| 
|align=left|
|-align=center
|Win
|15–0
|align=left| Sebastian Hill
|TKO
|3 
|25/02/2005
|align=left| 
|align=left|
|-align=center
|Win
|14–0
|align=left| Etianne Whitaker
|KO
|2 
|27/11/2004
|align=left| 
|align=left|
|-align=center
|Win
|13–0
|align=left| Conal MacPhee
|KO
|2 
|02/07/2004
|align=left| 
|align=left|
|-align=center
|Win
|12–0
|align=left| Willard Lewis
|UD
|8
|27/03/2004
|align=left| 
|align=left|
|-align=center
|Win
|11–0
|align=left| Laverne Clark
|TKO
|3 
|05/03/2004
|align=left| 
|align=left|
|-align=center
|Win
|10–0
|align=left| Joe Pastorello
|TKO
|2 
|06/02/2004
|align=left| 
|align=left|
|-align=center
|Win
|9–0
|align=left| John Turlington
|UD
|4
|31/01/2004
|align=left| 
|align=left|
|-align=center
|Win
|8–0
|align=left| Marc LeFleche
|TKO
|5 
|07/11/2003
|align=left| 
|align=left|
|-align=center
|Win
|7–0
|align=left| James Green
|KO
|5 
|05/09/2003
|align=left| 
|align=left|
|-align=center
|Win
|6–0
|align=left| Tyrone Jackson
|UD
|6
|25/07/2003
|align=left| 
|align=left|
|-align=center
|Win
|5–0
|align=left| Berry Basler
|KO
|3 
|25/04/2003
|align=left| 
|align=left|
|-align=center
|Win
|4–0
|align=left| Ola Afolabi
|UD
|4
|25/04/2003
|align=left| 
|align=left|
|-align=center
|Win
|3–0
|align=left| Rodney Moore
|KO
|1 
|07/02/2003
|align=left| 
|align=left|
|-align=center
|Win
|2–0
|align=left| Donnie Davis
|KO
|1 
|07/02/2003
|align=left| 
|align=left|
|-align=center
|Win
|1–0
|align=left| Robert Dykes
|TKO
|1 
|09/11/2002
|align=left| 
|align=left|
|-align=center

Personal life

Green is a vegetarian, he also enjoys comic books and games on the PlayStation.

References

External links
 

1979 births
American male boxers
Boxers from Oklahoma
National Golden Gloves champions
Living people
Sportspeople from Tulsa, Oklahoma
Super-middleweight boxers
20th-century American people
21st-century American people